Weightlifting at the 2007 All-Africa Games in Algiers was held between July 15–20, 2007.

Medal summary

Men

Women

Doping cases
Blessed Udoh who won 3 medals in the women's 48 kg, tested positive after the competition.

Medal table
Ranking by Big (Total result) medals

Key:

References

External links 
 "CWF, past results: 2007 African games" .

2007 All-Africa Games
Weightlifting at the African Games